Joel E. Ferris High School (also known as Ferris High School) is a four-year public high school in Spokane, Washington, part of Spokane Public Schools. In southeast Spokane's Southgate neighborhood, it was built at a cost of $3,235,861 and opened on September 3, 1963. The school was named in 1961 for Joel E. Ferris (1874–1960), a banker and civic leader in Spokane. Joel Ferris was a member of the Spokane Park Board, Spokane Finch Arboretum Committee, and a number of educational boards and historical societies in eastern Washington. 

The school colors are scarlet and silver and the mascot is a Saxon.

The school is also the location of the studios of KSPS-TV, a PBS member station owned by the school board, which serves eastern Washington and surrounding states, as well as enjoying significant viewership in the province of Alberta, Canada.

Beginning in 2005, the school underwent a major redevelopment, designed by NAC Architecture, with nearly the entire campus having been rebuilt. The project took most out of the school district's 320 million dollar project for all schools.

Recognition 
 Bands and Choirs: San Francisco Heritage Festival Sweepstakes Champions 2017
 Bands and Choirs: San Francisco Heritage Festival Sweepstakes Champions 2014 
 4A Lionel Hampton International Jazz Festival Champions 2011
 4A Football State Champions 2010
 Total Boys' State Cross Country Champions 1968, 1980, 1981, 2003, 2004, 2005, 2006, 2009
 4A Boys State Cross Country Champions: 2003, 2004, 2005, 2006, 2009
 4A Boys 3rd place State Cross Country: 2001, 2002, 2008
 4A Boys 4th place State Cross Country: 1998, 2010
 4A Boys 5th place State Cross Country: 2000
 4A Boys 6th place State Cross Country: 1997
 3A Boys State Cross Country Champions: 1980, 1981
 3A Boys 2nd place State Cross Country: 1974, 1988, 1995
 3A Boys 3rd place State Cross Country: 1973, 1993
 3A Boys 4th place State Cross Country: 1978, 1979,  
 2A Boys State Cross Country Champions: 1968
 3A Boys State Track Champions: 1971
Boys' Class 4A state basketball championship 1994, 2007 and 2008.
 Girls' track team are current 4A academic champions.
 GRAMMY Signature School for the 1998-99 school year
 Marching Band and Drill Team: 1997 Tournament of Roses Rose Parade
 Newsweek top 1300 high schools in 2008

Notable alumni

 Connor Halliday (class of 2010): Washington State football quarterback; holds NCAA record for most pass attempts and passing yards in a game
 Ryan Lewis: producer and DJ who performs alongside Macklemore; attended the school for his freshman and sophomore years
 Alex Prugh (class of 2003): professional golfer, Web.com and PGA Tour
 Leonard Christian: member of the Washington House of Representatives
 Jeff Robinson (class of 1988): defensive end, tight end, long snapper for 16 NFL seasons (1993–2009)
 Wayne Tinkle (class of 1984): professional basketball player in Europe, head coach at Oregon State University
 Austin Washington (class of 2004): professional soccer player
 George Yarno (class of 1975): guard for ten NFL and two USFL seasons (1979–89)
 John Yarno (class of 1973): center for NFL's Seattle Seahawks (1977–82)
 Gary J. Volesky (class of 1979): United States Army Major General and commander of 101st Airborne Division
 Andrew Kittredge (class of 2008): MLB pitcher for the Tampa Bay Rays
 Jonathan Parker (Class of 1998): Chairman, Idaho Republican Party
 Spokane Chiefs players education Program at Ferris High School. https://spokanechiefs.com/chiefs-education-program

References

External links
 Official site
 Cross Country References 

Spokane Public Schools
High schools in Spokane County, Washington
Educational institutions established in 1963
Public high schools in Washington (state)
1963 establishments in Washington (state)
Schools in Spokane, Washington